Best of the Early Years compiles the majority of Glen Campbell's biggest hits from the period 1967 - 1971. Some of his later hits are compiled on another Curb release called Greatest Country Hits.

Track listing
 "Gentle on My Mind" (John Hartford) - 2:56
 "By The Time I Get to Phoenix" (Jimmy Webb) - 2:42
 "Hey Little One" (Dorsey Burnette, Barry DeVorzon) - 2:31
 "Wichita Lineman" (Jimmy Webb)  -3:04
 "Galveston" (Jimmy Webb) - 2:40
 "Try a Little Kindness" (Austin/Sapaugh) - 2:23
 "Honey Come Back" (Jimmy Webb) - 2:56
 "Everything a Man Could Ever Need" (Mac Davis) - 2:30
 "It's Only Make Believe" (Conway Twitty, Jack Nance) - 2:25
 "Dream Baby (How Long Must I Dream)" (Cindy Walker) - 2:32
 "Your Cheatin' Heart" (Hank Williams) - 3:17
 "I'm So Lonesome I Could Cry" (Hank Williams) - 2:24

Production
Art direction/design - Neuman, Walker and Associates
Liner notes - Don Ovens
All tracks courtesy of Capitol Records under license from CEMA Special Markets

1991 greatest hits albums
Glen Campbell compilation albums
Curb Records compilation albums